Geophysical & Astrophysical Fluid Dynamics is a bimonthly peer-reviewed scientific journal covering applications of fluid dynamics in the fields of astrophysics and geophysics. It was established in 1970 as Geophysical Fluid Dynamics, obtaining its current name in 1977. It is published by Taylor & Francis and the editor-in-chief is Andrew Soward (Newcastle University). According to the Journal Citation Reports, the journal has a 2020 impact factor of 1.451.

References

External links

Geophysics journals
Astrophysics journals
Fluid dynamics journals
Publications established in 1970
Bimonthly journals
Taylor & Francis academic journals
English-language journals